John Beal (born James Alexander Bliedung, August 13, 1909 – April 26, 1997) was an American actor.

Early years
Beal was born James Alexander Bliedung in Joplin, Missouri. His father had a department store and Beal went to the Wharton School of the University of Pennsylvania "mapped for a commercial career." While at Wharton, Beal (who enrolled under his real name, James Alexander Bliedung) spent time drawing cartoons for the school's humor magazine and singing in productions of the Mask and Wig club.

Stage
Soon after graduating from college in 1930, Beal began acting with the Hedgerow Theatre. Beal originally went to New York to study at the Art Students League of New York. A chance to understudy in a play made him change his mind. He went on to appear in Russet Mantle and She Loves Me. Beal's Broadway credits include Three Men on a Horse (1993), The Seagull (1992), The Master Builder (1992), A Little Hotel on the Side (1992), The Crucible (1991), The Changing Room (1973), The Candyapple (1970), Our Town (1969), In the Matter of J. Robert Oppenheimer (1969), Billy (1969), Calculated Risk (1962), The Teahouse of the August Moon (1953), Leonard Sillman's New Faces of 1952 (1952), The Voice of the Turtle (1943), Liberty Jones (1941), I Know What I Like (1939), Miss Swan Expects (1939), Soliloquy (1938), Russet Mantle (1936), She Loves Me Not (1933), Another Language (1933), Another Language (1932), Wild Waves (1932), and No More Frontier (1931).

Film

Beal began acting in films with Another Language (1933), in which he re-created his stage role. He appeared opposite Katharine Hepburn (in the 1934 RKO film The Little Minister), among others; one of his notable screen appearances was as Marius Pontmercy in Les Misérables (1935). He continued appearing in films during the war years while serving in Special Services and the First Motion Picture Unit as actor and director of Army Air Forces camp shows and training films.

Beal had starring roles in the film dramas Alimony (1949) and My Six Convicts (1952).

Radio and television

During the summer of 1948, Beal acted in The Amazing Mr. Tutt on CBS radio. 

Beal was host of Freedom Rings, a game show on CBS-TV in 1953. In the 1950s, Beal also began appearing in various television shows, including the title role of mining engineer Philip Deidesheimer  in a 1959 episode of Bonanza,  "The Deidesheimer Story". Beal starred as Dr. Lewis on the ABC serial Road to Reality in 1960-1961. He portrayed Dr. Henden on the primetime medical drama The Nurses in the early 1960s and appeared on an afternoon version of the program in the latter half of the 1960s. 

He was hired to play the role of Jim Matthews in the television soap opera Another World when the show went on the air in 1964, but was fired by creator and headwriter Irna Phillips after only one episode.

He appeared in The Waltons, season 3, episode 13, "The Visitor", first aired in December, 1974. His character was a former neighbor, Mason Beardsley, an elderly man who returned to Waltons Mountain to live with his wife who he was expecting in a few days. The Walton family were excited for him and helped to fix up his home, only to learn that his wife had died a year earlier and, unable to accept this fact, he continued to look for her.

In 1976, Beal portrayed Charles Adams II in the PBS dramatic series The Adams Chronicles. He continued to work in films and television, notably as Judge Vail in the supernatural soap opera Dark Shadows (for 9 episodes), and also the theater up until the 1980s. Beal died at age 87 in Santa Cruz, California, two years after suffering a stroke.

Personal life
Beal was married to actress Helen Craig for 52 years until her death in 1986. They had two daughters, Theodora Emily and Tandy Johanna.

Filmography

References

External links

1909 births
1997 deaths
20th-century American male actors
American male film actors
American male soap opera actors
American male television actors
American male stage actors
American male radio actors
Male actors from Missouri
People from Joplin, Missouri